The Black Book of Corporations is a book by Austrian journalists Klaus-Werner Lobo and Hans Weiss published in 2001, soon after a wave of protests against the Group of Eight summit in Genoa.

The book describes the activity of many multinational corporations (multinational enterprises) connected with political and social discrimination, environmental pollution, and violations of labor laws, human rights and consumer protection.

Klaus Werner made detailed investigation of activity of the companies connected with multinational corporations which carried out purchases of raw materials from rebels in the Democratic Republic of the Congo where prisoner and child labor are used, and thus indirectly financing insurgents. His coauthor Hans Weiss told about carrying out illegal clinical trials of medical preparations in Eastern Europe. The authors reveal communication of neoliberal globalization and policy of multinational corporation in general and speak about interference of international policy, corporations and international organizations, such as the WTO, the IMF, the World Bank, etc.

In 2003 there was the second edition, The new black book of corporations. It was translated into the Dutch, Spanish, Hungarian, Turkish, Chinese, Korean, Swedish and Russian languages.

In 2006 there was a third processed edition of the book.

See also
 Anti-globalization movement
 Globalization
 Corporation
 No Logo

External links 
 Klaus Werner-Lobo / Hans Weiss: Schwarzbuch Markenfirmen. Die Welt im Griff der Konzerne.

Anti-globalization books
Opinion journalism
2001 non-fiction books